Parkway C-2 School District, or Parkway Schools, is a public school district serving eight municipalities in western St. Louis County, Missouri, United States. The district operates four comprehensive high schools, one alternative high school, five middle schools, and eighteen elementary schools, and one early childhood center. The district is named for the Daniel Boone Parkway, also known as Interstate 64.

List of schools
High schools
 Fern Ridge High School (alternative high school)
 Parkway Central High School
 Parkway North High School
 Parkway South High School
 Parkway West High School

Middle schools
 Parkway Central Middle School
 Parkway Northeast Middle School
 Parkway South Middle School
 Parkway Southwest Middle School
 Parkway West Middle School

Elementary schools

 Barretts Elementary School
 Bellerive Elementary School
 Carman Trails Elementary School
 Claymont Elementary School
 Craig Elementary School
 Green Trails Elementary School
 Hanna Woods Elementary School
 Henry Elementary School
 Highcroft Ridge Elementary School
 Mason Ridge Elementary School
 McKelvey Elementary School
 Oak Brook Elementary School
 Pierremont Elementary School
 River Bend Elementary School
 Ross Elementary School
 Shenandoah Valley Elementary School
 Sorrento Springs Elementary School
 Wren Hollow Elementary School

References

External links

School districts in Missouri
Education in St. Louis County, Missouri